Bubeneč is a district in the north-west of Prague. 52% of the district is in Prague 7, but most of the built-up area is in Prague 6. Sparta Prague football club and their stadium Generali Arena is situated at the south-eastern edge of Bubeneč, and the district also covers Stromovka park (Královská obora) and a convention centre Výstaviště. The name Bubeneč is masculine, although Czech grammar rules also allow its use as a feminine.

Bubeneč is sometimes informally called "Little Moscow" due to the high concentration of various entities and buildings related to the Russian government and private businesses, including the vast Embassy of Russia and the office of Rossotrudnichestvo.

History 
The earliest mention of Bubeneč is in 1197. On 26 October 1904, Bubeneč acquired city status. Bubeneč was a city between 1904 and 1921, when it was merged with Prague. The area attracted large numbers of Russian immigrants in the period before World War II. 

In 1980 the controversial Statue of Ivan Konev in Prague has been erected here.

See also 

 Boris Nemtsov Square, Prague

References

Districts of Prague
Prague 7